Founded in 1940, the National Horsemen’s Benevolent and Protective Association (National HBPA) and its affiliates operate as a trade association on behalf of Thoroughbred racehorse owners, trainers and backstretch personnel throughout the United States and Canada.

The National HBPA was started in New England by a group of committed horsemen that included Irv Gushen, Doug Davis, John Manfuso, Dr. Alex Harthill, Johnny McDowell, Mort Wolfson, and Jack DeFee. 

Even before the National HBPA was founded, horsemen had a habit of taking care of their own. If someone was sick or down on his luck, they “passed the hat” taking up collections. This time-honored tradition of racetrackers provided for burial services, medical attention, and feeding and housing for the needy families. Founded with that goal in mind, the National HBPA has expanded its scope well beyond its initial motto of “Horsemen Helping Horsemen” and now represents horsemen’s interests on a myriad of issues, including legislation, medication, aftercare, equine health, safety, education and more. Currently there are nearly 30,000 members of the National HBPA.

The National HBPA oversees the National HBPA Foundation (NHBPAF), a tax-exempt 501 (c)(3) fund that was developed as a safety net for horsemen when other forms of assistance are unavailable or have been exhausted after disaster strikes. 

In partnership with Thoroughbred Owners and Breeders Association, the National HBPA also operates the Claiming Crown, a major racing event celebrating the “blue-collar” horses of the racing industry.

References

External links
National HBPA official web site

Horse racing in the United States
Horse racing in Canada